Henriikka Hietaniemi (born 26 May 1987) is a Finnish former competitive figure skater. She is the 2006 Cup of Nice silver medalist and 2009 Nordic bronze medalist.

Programs

Competitive highlights

References

External links 
 

Finnish female single skaters
Figure skaters at the 2007 Winter Universiade
1987 births
Sportspeople from Helsinki
Living people
Competitors at the 2011 Winter Universiade
21st-century Finnish women